Co-Opertition FIRST was the 2000 game for the FIRST Robotics Competition.

Field
There is a  clearance bar under each goal. Around the perimeter of the field are four stations for human players, who work with remote controlled robots on the field to score points. At the start of each match, each alliance station contains seven yellow balls and one black ball. Fifteen yellow balls and two black balls are located at the far end of the playing field.

Robots
The robots are powered by a sealed lead-acid battery from Yuasa Exide, Inc. and use motors from S-B Power Tool Company, ITT Automotive, Keyang, Globe Motor, and Delphi Interior and Lighting. They also use speed controllers and a programmable control system supplied by FIRST. Drivers use joysticks from CH Products and switches from Honeywell to remotely control the robots via a radio link which uses RNet wireless modems from Motorola.

Scoring
Each match is two minutes long. Alliances receive one point for each yellow ball and five points for each black ball in their goal, and not in contact with their robot. Robots that are completely on the ramp each earn five points for their alliance. A robot hanging from the horizontal bar connecting the two goals earns ten points for its alliance.

"Co-Opertition"
The idea of Co-opertition stems from the games scoring for the qualifying matches.  The winning alliance receives 3x the loser's score as their qualifying points.  Thus, it is more beneficial to win a match 10-9 than 20–0.

Events

The following regional events were held in 2000:
Week 1
 Kennedy Space Center Southeast Regional - Kennedy Space Center, FL
 Great Lakes Regional - Eastern Michigan University, Ypsilanti, MI

Week 2
 Johnson & Johnson Mid-Atlantic Regional - Rutgers University, New Brunswick, NJ
 NASA Langley/VCU Regional - Virginia Commonwealth University, Richmond, VA
 Lone Star Regional - Astro Arena Complex, Houston

Week 3
 Philadelphia Alliance Regional - Drexel University, Philadelphia
 Motorola Midwest Regional - Northwestern University, Evanston, Il
 Long Island Regional - Suffolk County Community College, Long Island, NY

Week 4
 UTC New England Regional - Meadows Music Theater, Hartford, CT
 NASA Ames Regional - San Jose State University, San Jose, CA

Championship
The national championship was held at Epcot Center, Disney World, Orlando. The Championship  Alliance consisted of Teams 255, 232, and Team 25. Teams 255 and 232 no longer compete.

References

External links

2000 in robotics
FIRST Robotics Competition games